Ireane Ruíz (born 2 April 1973) is a Spanish taekwondo practitioner. She was born in Logroño, La Rioja. She competed at the 2000 Summer Olympics in Sydney. She won a gold medal in middleweight at the 1995 World Taekwondo Championships in Manila, and a bronze medal at the 1997 World Taekwondo Championships in Hong Kong.

References

External links

1973 births
Living people
Spanish female taekwondo practitioners
Olympic taekwondo practitioners of Spain
Taekwondo practitioners at the 2000 Summer Olympics
World Taekwondo Championships medalists
20th-century Spanish women
21st-century Spanish women